Ectoedemia aegaeica is a moth of the family Nepticulidae. It is endemic to mainland Greece and Rhodes.

The larvae feed on Vitex agnus-castus. They mine the leaves of their host plant. The mine strongly resembles that of Ectoedeia groschkei, but is somewhat smaller.

External links
bladmineerders.nl
Fauna Europaea

Nepticulidae
Moths of Europe
Moths described in 1998